The Spokesman of the Presidency, or the Press Office, is responsible for gathering and disseminating information regarding the Presidency to the media. The Press Office is part of the Secretariat of Social Communications, which is a subunit of the Executive Office of Brazil. The current spokesman, Otávio Santana, was appointed by President Jair Bolsonaro, on January 14, 2019.

Responsibilities

The Press Office is responsible for providing support and information to the national and international media regarding the President's beliefs, activities and actions. It works alongside the Secretariat of Social Communications in crafting and espousing the administration's message. It coordinates accreditation, access and flow of media professionals to the events that have the participation of President.

It also articulates with other government agencies' press offices, the dissemination of programs, policies, acts, events, ceremonies and trips in which the President participates and provides journalistic and administrative support to the Palácio do Planalto press unit.

List of Spokesperson

References

External links
 Press Office and Spokesman of the Presidency 

Lists of government ministers of Brazil
Executive branch of Brazil